Dora Estella Knatchbull (née Bright; 16 August 1862 – 16 November 1951) was an English composer and pianist. She composed works for orchestra, keyboard and voice, and music for opera and ballet, including ballets for performance by the dancer Adeline Genée.

Biography
Dora Bright was born in Stanton Broom, Sheffield, Yorkshire. Her father was Augustus Bright, a cutlery manufacturer and hardware merchant. He was a grandson of the jeweller and watchmaker Isaac Bright, who had been one of the founders of Sheffield's Jewish community, having settled there c. 1786. Augustus also served as a vice consul for Brazil, and as a captain of the Hallamshire Volunteer Rifle Corps. He was an amateur violinist and in 1873 Dora, aged nine, performed alongside him in a benefit concert for his military unit. He died on 1 November 1880, at the age of 50. His business was inherited by his widow, but it failed in 1882.

Dora's mother was Katherine Coveney Pitt, an actress, playwright and manager of a theatre company.
Also known as Kate Pitt or as Mrs Augustus Bright, she was a daughter of the actors Charles Dibdin Pitt and Ellen Coveney. Charles Dibdin Pitt, who was a son of the dramatist George Dibdin Pitt, was lessee of the Theatre Royal, Sheffield, until his death on 21 February 1866, aged 47, and was succeeded as lessee of that theatre by his widow. Kate Pitt's works included the plays Not False but Fickle, Noblesse Oblige, Bracken Hollow and Naomi's Sin. She adapted another play, Dane's Dyke, from her own novel, Unto the Third and Fourth Generation. In 1881 Dora acted in Dane's Dyke, alongside her mother, at the Theatre Royal.

While at the Royal Academy of Music during 1881–89, Bright's teachers included Walter Macfarren and Ebenezer Prout. She was the first woman to receive the Charles Lucas Medal for musical composition, for her Air and Variations for String Quartet in 1888. Her circle of close friends there included fellow students Edward German and his fiancée Ethel Boyce. Boyce subsequently partnered her in concert performances of Bright's piano duet Variations on an Original Theme of Sir G. A. Macfarren, named for George Alexander Macfarren, their teacher's brother.

In 1889, 1890 and 1892 she made concert tours of Germany, including Dresden, Cologne and Leipzig, with performances of her piano concerto in A minor. In 1892 she married Wyndham Knatchbull (1829–1900), a captain of the 3rd Dragoon Guards and a great-grandson of Edward Knatchbull, 7th Baronet of Mersham Hatch. Thereafter she lived at Babington House in Babington, Somerset, and became a local leader of charitable amateur productions such as performances of Gilbert and Sullivan comic operas. From around 1897, her own piano concert performances tailed off. She changed direction towards composing music for dramatic performances. An early success in this line came in 1903 when The Dancing Girl and the Idol, an oriental fantasy with words by Edith Lyttelton, was given an amateur production at a prestigious charity event in Chatsworth House. In 1904, the piece was performed at Chatsworth again, by royal request, as King Edward had missed the 1903 performance through illness.

She was also the composer for ballets created with Adeline Genée, in a collaboration which also involved the designer C. Wilhelm. These ballets included The Dryad, La Camargo and La danse. As well as dancing these in London, Genée performed them during her successful tours of America, Australia and New Zealand.

Bright's Suite bretonne was performed at the Proms in August 1917. On 8 April 1937 she performed an orchestral piano concert for BBC Radio. On 28 April 1939 the BBC broadcast her playing from her home, Babington House.

Around 1940, Bright began to work for the magazine Musical Opinion. Her association with the magazine coincided with a re-directing of its editorial policy onto a sternly reactionary course and a decline in readership.   
 
She died at Babington in 1951. Many of her works have not survived.

Works

Selected works include:

Ballets
The Dryad (25 March 1907, Playhouse Theatre, London)
The Faun (10 October 1910, Empire Theatre of Varieties, London)
La Camargo (20 May 1912, London Coliseum)
La danse (17 December 1912, Metropolitan Opera, New York)
A Dancer's Adventure (11 October 1915, London Coliseum)
The Love Song (2 February 1933, London Coliseum)

Piano with orchestra
Piano concerto No. 1 in A minor (1888)
Piano concerto No. 2 in D minor (1892)
Fantasia in G minor (1892)
Variations for piano and orchestra (1910)

Orchestral
Concertstück for six drums and orchestra (c. 1915)
Suite bretonne for flute and orchestra (1917)

Piano
Variations on an Original Theme of Sir G. A. Macfarren, duet (1894)

Songs
Twelve Songs (1889) (text by Shakespeare, Herrick and others)
Six Songs from the Jungle Book (1903) (text by Kipling)

References

External links
LiederNet Archive
The search for the music and papers of Dora Bright
 Piano Concertos by Dora Bright and Ruth Gipps: notes to SOMMCD 273 (2019) by Robert Matthew Walker

1862 births
1951 deaths
20th-century British people
English Romantic composers
English classical composers
British women classical composers
English classical pianists
English women pianists
British ballet composers
English opera composers
Musicians from Sheffield
Alumni of the Royal Academy of Music
English people of Jewish descent
Women opera composers
Dora
20th-century English women musicians
20th-century women composers
19th-century women composers
19th-century English women
19th-century women pianists
20th-century women pianists